Soda is a Franco-Belgian comics series by Tome (writing)  and Bruno Gazzotti (art). The first two albums and the first eleven pages of the third were drawn by Luc Warnant, and the last (thirteenth) album by Dan (Dan Verlinden). It first appeared in the Franco-Belgian comics magazine Spirou on 29 April 1986.

Soda is the nickname of the main character of the series, NYPD Lieutenant David Elliot Hanneth Solomon, who masquerades as a priest for the benefit of his mother's health. In the Finnish version his real name was changed to Patrick Timothy O'Ralley. Soda only has three fingers on his left hand.

Synopsis
The son of the sheriff of the town of Providence, Arizona, David Solomon moved to New York City. Unable to find work he reluctantly joined the police force, but in his letters home he led his parents to believe that he had become a parish priest. This was in order to keep their minds at ease, since they did not want him to get into such a dangerous profession like his father. When his widowed mother Mary moved into his New York flat, David was forced to maintain the deception in fear that the truth would cause her a heart attack.

Thus, when he leaves for work, "Father David Solomon" is dressed as a priest on his way to his chapel, but in the elevator he switches to casual clothes which he wears as Lieutenant David Solomon aka "Soda" of the NYPD. He switches back to his priest's uniform when returning to the flat.

This can cause more than a few problems, and there are many times when David resolves to tell his mother the truth. However a timely reminder of her health by a third party means that he has to drop this resolution.

More often than not there is no time to switch clothing, so Soda is forced to go into action with a revolver in his priest clothes. He pays little heed to the Ten Commandments, let alone the "Thou shalt not kill" rule!

Mary herself fears New York City so much that she sticks to staying in the flat, rarely daring to go outside. As far as she is concerned, her beloved son's only vice is his smoking, which she keeps trying to discourage.

This premise helps to juxtapose the quiet and comfort of home life against the brutality and action of a policeman constantly chasing the dangerous elements of New York society. Sometimes the thugs that he deals with in his work find out where Soda lives, and he needs to work twice as hard to keep the criminals away from his mother and to keep her blissfully unaware of the dangers that encroach upon her (and him).

Soda's left hand has two fingers missing and is permanently gloved. So far it has never been explained how he lost these fingers.

Secondary characters
Soda's colleagues include:

Police Captain Pronzini who often takes his pets to the office only for them to fall prey to his officers' humour, which can sometime be fatal (and not for the officers).

Sergeant Babs, whose constant eating means that he is most often deskbound, but his computer skills can be very useful in obtaining information. Babs is married to Martha, a rather ferocious housewife and mother-of-five, and to whom Babs is often unfaithful.

Officer Linda Tchaikowsky is Soda's partner in the fight against crime. Every morning she picks him up from his flat in the patrol car and drops him off in the evening — provided the case they have been handling does not result in her ending up in hospital. A divorcee, she is a tough African-American woman with rather expedient methods of getting the job done.

These characters help Soda maintain the pretense. If they have to call him and the phone is answered by Mary, they claim to be from the Salvation Army or a local convent.

Stories
Soda's adventures have not been published in English, and only the first adventure was ever released in Finnish as part of Kirjakerho's Parhaat Sarjat series (issue #30, 1989). Below is a list of the French titles, their year of publication, an English translation of the titles and a brief description.

Sources

Soda publications in Spirou BDoubliées 
Soda albums Bedetheque 
Kirjakerho Parhaat Sarjat listing 

Footnotes

Belgian comic strips
1986 comics debuts
Male characters in comics
Comics characters introduced in 1986
Dupuis titles
Crime comics
Fictional priests and priestesses
Fictional New York City Police Department lieutenants
Fictional amputees
Comics set in New York City
Comics about police officers